This is a list of adventure anime television series, films, and OVAs.

References

Adventure